Ivan Brondi de Carvalho (born 7 October 1941) is a Brazilian former footballer.

References

1941 births
Living people
Association football midfielders
Brazilian footballers
Brazilian dentists
Sociedade Esportiva Palmeiras players
Footballers at the 1960 Summer Olympics
Olympic footballers of Brazil